Alessia Rovegno Cayo (born 20 January 1998) is a Peruvian-Italian model, singer and beauty pageant titleholder who was crowned Miss Peru 2022. As Miss Peru, Rovegno represented Peru at Miss Universe 2022 and placed in the top 16 semi-finalist.

Early life and career 
She belongs to one of the most influential families in the world of Peruvian entertainment—which also includes her aunt and famous actress Stephanie Cayo. Her parents are Peruvian actress and singer Barbara Cayo and Italian bakery businessman Lucho Rovegno who owns a Bakery located in Peru, Lima. She and her older sister Arianna Rovegno Cayo are of Peruvian and Italian descent. She is also the niece of Peruvian actress and singer Fiorella Cayo and Macs Cayo.

Rovegno studied at the exclusive Markham College and later discovered her passion for modeling and singing. She has been on the cover of the Peruvian magazines Cosas and Asia Sur while in 2022 she participated in New York Fashion Week.

On 6 October 2021, she released her song Un Amor Como el Nuestro.

Personal life 
On 12 December 2021, Rovegno is currently in a relationship with Peruvian athlete Hugo García, it is because of this relationship that she became media and well-known, since it was covered by show business.

Pageantry 
On 14 June 2022, Rovegno joined Miss Peru 2022 pageant and was broadcast live on an open signal through the reality show Esto es guerra on America Television studios in Lima. At the end of the event, she was crowned as Miss Peru Universe 2022 and was succeeded by Miss Peru 2021 Yely Rivera of Arequipa.

As Miss Peru, Rovegno represented the country at Miss Universe 2022 and competed against 84 other candidates at the Ernest N. Morial Convention Center in New Orleans, Louisiana, United States. She concluded her Miss Universe journey by finishing as a Top 16 semi-finalist. R'Bonney Gabriel of the United States won the said pageant.

Discography
Un amor como el nuestro (2021)
Nada serio (2022)

References

External links

1998 births
Living people
Miss Universe 2022 contestants
Miss Peru
Peruvian female models
Peruvian people of Italian descent
Peruvian beauty pageant winners